The 2003 Brown Bears football team was an American football team that represented Brown University during the 2003 NCAA Division I-AA football season. Brown tied for second in the Ivy League. 

In their sixth season under head coach Phil Estes, the Bears compiled a 5–5 record and were outscored 246 to 244. C. Garnett, B.J. Grinna and K.R. Slager were the team captains. 

The Bears' 4–3 conference record placed them in a four-way tie for second in the Ivy League standings. They outscored Ivy opponents 193 to 192. 

Brown played its home games at Brown Stadium in Providence, Rhode Island.

Schedule

References

Brown
Brown Bears football seasons
Brown Bears football